Morning Glory is an unincorporated community located in Nicholas County, Kentucky, United States. Its post office  closed in 1921.

References

Unincorporated communities in Nicholas County, Kentucky
Unincorporated communities in Kentucky